Singing With the Red Wolves is the first independently produced album by the band Wishing Chair.  It was released in 1995 on Terrakin Records.  The album cover art is from a painting by artist Dana Tiger.

The title song refers to attempts by biologists to reintroduce red wolves into areas in the Southeastern United States where they had become locally extinct.

Track listing
 Keep Me Simple
 It's All I Need
 Robert's Waltz
 Sometimes
 Open Range
 Victoria
 Poem
 Traveler
 Wyoming Wind
 Weave and Spin
 Singing With the Red Wolves

1995 albums
Wishing Chair albums